Pletena is a village in Southwestern Bulgaria. It is located in the Satovcha Municipality, Blagoevgrad Province.

Geography 

The village of Pletena is located in the Western Rhodope Mountains. It belongs to the Chech region.

History 

In 1873, Pletena had male population of 210 Pomaks and 80 houses. According to Vasil Kanchov, in 1900 Pletena was populated by 770 Bulgarian Muslims According to another statistic by Kanchov about the same time, there were 190 houses in the village. According to Stephan Verkovic, at the end of the 19th century, the village had male population of 275 Pomaks and 81 houses.

In 1969, while ploughing near the village of Pletena, a local farmer discovered a grave of a Thracian warrior. Soon after arriving, the archeologists discovered a helmet, a Rhomphaia, a pair of knee-pieces and six pieces of protection equipment for the neck, as well as, other smaller objects.

Religions 

The population is Muslim and consists of Pomaks.

Cultural and natural landmarks 

The cave Mechata dupka (The Bear's Hole) is 12 meters long with 2 meters denivelation (vertical rise).

Further reading

Notes 

Villages in Blagoevgrad Province
Chech